is a Japanese footballer currently playing as a forward for Albirex Niigata of J2 League.

Career statistics

Club

Notes

References

External links

1997 births
Living people
Sportspeople from Tokyo Metropolis
Association football people from Tokyo Metropolis
Niigata University of Health and Welfare alumni
Japanese footballers
Association football forwards
J2 League players
Tokyo Musashino United FC players
Albirex Niigata players